Ankita Ravinderkrishan Raina (born 11 January 1993) is an Indian professional tennis player. Since 2013, she has regularly been the Indian number one in both singles and doubles.

Raina has won one title on the WTA Tour and one at WTA 125 tournaments (both in doubles), along with 11 singles and 24 doubles titles on the ITF Circuit. In April 2018, she entered the top 200 singles rankings for the first time, becoming only the fifth player representing India to achieve this feat. Raina has also won gold medals in the women's singles and mixed-doubles events at the 2016 South Asian Games, and won a bronze medal in singles at the 2018 Asian Games. Raina is one of only two women representing India who has won a WTA-level title.

Playing for India Fed Cup team, Raina has a win–loss record of 26–21. She has notable wins over 2011 US Open champion Samantha Stosur, Wimbledon finalist Sabine Lisicki and former world No. 5 Sara Errani.

Personal life
Raina was born in the Indian state of Gujarat to Lalita Raina and Ravinder Kishen Raina. She was born and brought up in Ahmedabad before moving to Pune, Maharashtra at the age of 14. Pune has a better infrastructure for raising young tennis talent, and the decision to move was based on a great performance at the Asians 14 and under masters tournament in Melbourne, where she placed second. Raina briefly studied at Brihan Maharashtra and is fluent in Hindi, Kashmiri, Gujarati, and English.

At the national events, Raina has represented her home state Gujarat. Her idols growing up were Roger Federer, Rafael Nadal, Serena Williams, and Sania Mirza.

Raina trains at the Hemant Bendrey Tennis Academy at the PYC Hindu Gymkhana in Pune.

Career

2008–16: Junior career
Raina started playing tennis at the age of five. From a young age she has been coached by Hemant Bendrey, who recognized her strong discipline and mentality. Following a promising junior career, Raina made her first professional appearance in 2009, at a small ITF tournament in Mumbai. In 2010, she continued to participate in local ITF events with limited success. Raina's 2011 season saw her advance to three ITF Circuit finals in doubles, winning one with countrywoman Aishwarya Agrawal. In 2012, she won her first professional singles title in New Delhi and won three more in doubles. This was followed by a few years of mediocre results on the ITF Women's Circuit.

2017–19: Breakthrough
Raina won two matches at the Mumbai Open, advancing to the quarterfinal. This would turn out to be her breakthrough tournament. In April 2018, she reached a ranking of world No. 181, after winning a $25k title, becoming the fifth Indian national to crack to the top-200 ladies singles rankings, following Nirupama Sanjeev, Sania Mirza, Shikha Uberoi, and Sunitha Rao.

In August 2018, Ankita won the bronze medal in the Asian Games at Jakarta, Indonesia in singles event. Raina and Sania Mirza are the only players representing India to have won a singles medal at the Asian Games. Later that year, she won the biggest doubles title of her career at the Taipei Challenger, partnering with compatriot Karman Kaur Thandi.

Following a loss at the Australian Open, Raina won a $25k title in Singapore, with a solid win over Arantxa Rus in the final. At the Kunming Open, she got her first top-100 win, defeating Samantha Stosur, former US Open champion and top-10 player, scoring the biggest win of her career. At the French Open, Raina lost her first qualifying match to well-known American youngster Coco Gauff in two tight sets, despite playing well. She went on to reach the second qualifying rounds of both the Wimbledon Championships and the US Open, losing tight three-setters in both tournaments. In October 2019, Raina entered the top 150 doubles rankings for the first time, after reaching the finals of the Suzhou Ladies Open with partner Rosalie van der Hoek. She is now coached by Arjun Kadhe, who is also her trainer and hitting partner.

2020–21: Grand Slam main-draw and Olympics debut
Raina had a disappointing result at the Australian Open, albeit she was unwell due to the Australian bushfires. However, Raina found further doubles success by winning two back-to-back ITF titles in Nonthaburi alongside Bibiane Schoofs; followed by reaching her first WTA Tour semifinal at the Thailand Open alongside Rosalie. This gave Raina a new career-high ranking of No. 119 in doubles. She also won two singles titles early on in 2020, one in Nonthaburi, and the other in Jodhpur, India. Raina then helped India advance to the Fed Cup World Group 2 playoffs for the first time in history in April 2020 in Dubai, along with Sania Mirza, Rutuja Bhosale, Riya Bhatia and Sowjanya Bavisetti. In the Fed Cup, Raina had put up a good fight and won the first set 6–1 against China's top player Wang Qiang, but lost the match in three tight sets.

Raina returned to competition at the resumption of the tour in September after a long hiatus due to the ongoing COVID-19 pandemic; she suffered early exits in ITF tournaments she played in after the break. She then competed at the 2020 French Open qualifying where she advanced to the second round for the first time but lost to Kurumi Nara. In December, Raina won the biggest ITF doubles title of her career at Dubai, alongside Ekaterine Gorgodze, and reached a new career-high doubles ranking of 117.

Raina competed in all the Grand Slam championships and the Olympics in 2021 but had first-round exits in all in doubles category. She competed mixed doubles only in Wimbledon but that too was a first-round exit. Raina began 2021 at the Australian Open, where she had her best performance at a major, losing in the third and final qualifying round to Olga Danilović. She then became the fourth player representing India to feature in the main draw of a Grand Slam championship (after Nirupama Mankad, Nirupama Sanjeev, and Sania Mirza), playing doubles alongside Mihaela Buzărnescu, losing in the first round.

Raina won the first WTA Tour singles main-draw match of her career at the Phillip Island Trophy. She came from a break down in the third set to reel off the last six games for a 5–7, 6–1, 6–2 win over Elisabetta Cocciaretto. She then lost to Kimberly Birrell. In doubles, Raina partnered with Kamilla Rakhimova to advance to her first WTA level final, where they defeated the Russian pairing of Anastasia Potapova and Anna Blinkova. With this victory, Ankita become the second Indian female after Sania Mirza to win a WTA title, and also the third Indian woman after Mirza and Shikha Uberoi to break into the top 100 of the WTA rankings, debuting at world No. 94 in doubles.

Her improved ranking allowed her to compete more regularly on the WTA Tour, albeit with limited success. At the Abierto Zapopan, Raina scored a victory over former world No. 5 and French Open finalist, Sara Errani, before losing to Leonie Küng. At the French Open, she lost in the second qualifying round in singles, and the first round of the main draw in doubles. Raina enjoyed a strong grass-court season in doubles, reaching back to back semifinals at the Nottingham Open and Nottingham Trophy. At Wimbledon, she competed in all three events, losing in the first qualifying round of singles to Varvara Lepchenko and the first round of doubles and mixed doubles, partnering Lauren Davis and Ramkumar Ramanathan, respectively.

Sania Mirza's protected ranking of No. 9 meant that Raina and Mirza gained direct entry into the Tokyo Olympics in women's doubles. They lost in three sets in the first round to the Kichenok sisters, in spite of leading 6–0, 5–2.

Raina competed at the 2021 US Open, losing in the first round of singles qualifying to Jamie Loeb and the first round of doubles. This meant she had played in the main draw of doubles at all four major tournaments. She then won only one of her next seven matches in singles, to end the year outside the top 200. She also lost seven out of her eight doubles matches during this stretch.

For her achievements at the Asian Games and South Asian Games, Raina was conferred the Arjuna Award in 2021.

2022
Raina's poor form from the end of 2021 carried into 2022, with her losing in the first qualifying round of the Australian open, and then at and ITF Tournament in Kazakhstan. The losses caused her to drop out of the top 350 and return to playing on the ITF tour. Her form improved in the second half of the season, and she won 18 of her last 27 matches to end the year in the top 270. Her lone final of the season came in August, at the ITF tournament at Aldershot, losing to Chinese Taipei player Joanna Garland.

However, she was much more successful in doubles, reaching nine ITF finals, winning five of them.

Playing style

Raina is a steady baseliner who primarily relies on her speed and counterpunching abilities to outlast her opponents. Her preferred surfaces are grass and hard court, as they are more suited to her game style.

Sponsorship and equipment
In her junior years, Raina was helped by Dishman Pharmaceuticals and Chemicals to participate in overseas junior tournaments. Since then, she has been supported by Bharat Forge and Lakshya. Most recently, Raina has signed sponsorship deals with the Sports Authority of Gujarat and Yonex, and she is officially employed with ONGC. Hence, Raina uses Yonex racquets and clothing. Adani Group is her current supporter.

In 2013, Raina met Narendra Modi, India's then-future prime minister, and officially was recognised under the Shaktidhoot scheme and hence became a part of India's goal of reaching Olympic podiums.

Performance timelines

Singles
Current after the 2023 Dubai Open.

Doubles

WTA career finals

Doubles: 1 (1 title)

WTA Challenger finals

Doubles: 1 (1 title)

ITF Circuit finals

Singles: 22 (11 titles, 11 runner–ups)

Doubles: 41 (24 titles, 17 runner–ups)

Fed Cup participation

Singles

Doubles

Asian Games

Singles (bronze medal)

Notes

References

External links
 
 
 
 
 
 

1993 births
Living people
Indian female tennis players
Sportspeople from Ahmedabad
Tennis players at the 2020 Summer Olympics
Olympic tennis players of India
Tennis players at the 2014 Asian Games
Kashmiri people
Kashmiri Pandits
Sportswomen from Gujarat
21st-century Indian women
21st-century Indian people
Racket sportspeople from Gujarat
Tennis players at the 2018 Asian Games
Medalists at the 2018 Asian Games
Asian Games bronze medalists for India
Asian Games medalists in tennis
South Asian Games gold medalists for India
South Asian Games medalists in tennis
Recipients of the Arjuna Award